Bill Butler (born 30 March 1956 in Glasgow) is a Scottish Labour Co-operative politician. He was the Member of the Scottish Parliament (MSP) for Glasgow Anniesland from a by-election in 2000 (following the death of the incumbent, First Minister Donald Dewar) until losing his seat in the 2011 election.

Butler is also a committed member of CND and has voted against the party in matters concerning nuclear weapons.

Early life and career
Born in Glasgow, Butler graduated from the University of Stirling and Notre Dame College of Education in Bearsden. He taught at a number of schools in Renfrewshire and in Rutherglen, including Stonelaw High School, from 1980 to 2000.

Reform of damages legislation
In June 2010, Butler launched a Member's Bill in the Scottish Parliament to reform the law on damages for wrongful death, which was successful, being passed by the Parliament on 3 March 2011 with unanimous support. The Bill was based on recommendations from the Scottish Law Commission intended to bring about fairer levels of compensation for victims of wrongful death cases (e.g. industrial accidents and disease) and their loved ones. The reforms will also mean less cases needing to go to court, which in some cases will eliminate the need for details of victims' lives to be the subject of courtroom wrangling and in all cases will mean that compensation will be paid out more speedily.

Parliamentary activity
Previously, Butler sought backing in the Scottish Parliament for a bill to make Scottish health boards part-elected. His efforts won the backing of the Health Committee and Health Minister at the time, Andy Kerr, agreed to allow the scheme to be piloted.

In August 2008 he declared himself a candidate for the Deputy Leadership of the Labour Party in the Scottish Parliament, but was not elected.

After losing his Holyrood seat, he was selected as a Labour candidate for the Greater Pollok ward in the Glasgow City Council elections in 2012 and topped the poll with 2,462 first preferences. In 2017 he stood for the Garscadden/Scotstounhill ward and again was elected as the leading candidate.

Anti-sectarianism
Butler has been at the forefront of the campaign to tackle sectarianism in Scotland. In June 2009 he persuaded Alex Salmond to bring before the Scottish Parliament a new strategy to tackle sectarianism.

Personal life 
Butler is married to Patricia Ferguson, a fellow Labour MSP and former Minister for Tourism, Culture and Sport.

References

External links 
 
 Anniesland Labour – Website

1956 births
Living people
Members of the Scottish Parliament for Glasgow constituencies
Scottish schoolteachers
Labour MSPs
Councillors in Glasgow
Alumni of the University of Stirling
Members of the Scottish Parliament 1999–2003
Members of the Scottish Parliament 2003–2007
Members of the Scottish Parliament 2007–2011
People educated at St Mungo's Academy
Scottish Labour councillors